The Tenement house of Leib Osnos in Warsaw (Polish: Kamienica Lejba Osnosa w Warszawie) is a tenement house located at 28 Twarda Street in the Wola district of Warsaw.

History 
The tenement house was built in 1911. During World War II from 1940 to 1942 it was located in the Warsaw Ghetto. In 2009 all the residents of the tenement moved out.

Inside the tenement there are remains of a lot architectural decoration. In 2019, it was entered in the register of historical monuments.

References 

Buildings and structures in Warsaw